The Star Awards for Best Info-Ed Programme is an award presented annually at the Star Awards, a ceremony that was established in 1994.

The category was introduced in 2006, at the 13th Star Awards ceremony; Y Do You Care received the award and it is given in honour of a Mediacorp info-ed programme which has delivered an outstanding overall performance. The nominees are determined by a team of judges employed by Mediacorp; winners are selected by a majority vote from the entire judging panel.

Since its inception, the award has been given to 12 info-ed programmes. Cooking For A Cause is the most recent winner in this category. Since the ceremony held in 2017, Tuesday Report remains as the only info-ed programme to win in this category five times, surpassing Find Me A Singaporean which has two wins. In addition, Tuesday Report has been nominated on 19 occasions, more than any other info-ed programme. Behind Every Job, Food Hometown and Of Rites And Rituals hold the record for the most nominations without a win, with two.

Recipients

 Each year is linked to the article about the Star Awards held that year.

 Prior to 2006, Tuesday Report was titled TR Report.

Category facts
Most wins

Most nominations

See also 
Star Awards
Star Awards for Best Info-Ed Programme Host

References

External links 

Star Awards